Heutelia is a German book about a journey through Switzerland, published anonymously in Paris in 1658, and attributed to Hans Franz Veiras. It is notable as a work of baroque literature and as a critical account of social conditions in seventeenth-century Switzerland. 

The book consists of 297 octavo pages. The book has been incorrectly ascribed to Jakob von Graviseth.

The title, Heutelia, is an anagram of Helvetia, the Latin name of Switzerland (U and V were considered the same letter). The invented name also evokes the Greek adjective εὔθηλος (euthēlos) meaning "with a full udder," thus playing on stereotypes of the Swiss as a nation of cowherds.

References

1658 books
Baroque literature
Books about Switzerland
German non-fiction books
Travel books